Banamalipur is one of the 60 Legislative Assembly constituencies of Tripura state in India. It is part of West Tripura district and a part of Tripura West (Lok Sabha constituency).

Members of Legislative Assembly

Election results

2018 election

2013 election

See also
List of constituencies of the Tripura Legislative Assembly
West Tripura district

References

West Tripura district
Assembly constituencies of Tripura